SMC complexes represent a large family of ATPases that participate in many aspects of higher-order chromosome organization and dynamics. SMC stands for Structural Maintenance of Chromosomes.

Classification

Eukaryotic SMCs
Eukaryotes have at least six SMC proteins in individual organisms, and they form three distinct heterodimers with specialized functions:
 A pair of SMC1 and SMC3 constitutes the core subunits of the cohesin complexes involved in sister chromatid cohesion. 
 Likewise, a pair of SMC2 and SMC4 acts as the core of the condensin complexes implicated in chromosome condensation. 
 A dimer composed of SMC5 and SMC6 functions as part of a yet-to-be-named complex implicated in DNA repair and checkpoint responses.

Each complex contains a distinct set of non-SMC regulatory subunits. Some organisms have variants of SMC proteins. For instance, mammals have a meiosis-specific variant of SMC1, known as SMC1β. The nematode Caenorhabditis elegans has an SMC4-variant that has a specialized role in dosage compensation.

Prokaryotic SMCs
SMC proteins are conserved from bacteria to humans. Most bacteria have a single SMC protein in individual species that forms a homodimer. In a subclass of Gram-negative bacteria, including Escherichia coli, a distantly related protein known as MukB plays an equivalent role.

Molecular structure

Primary structure
SMC proteins are 1,000-1,500 amino-acid long. They have a modular structure that is composed of the following domains:
 Walker A ATP-binding motif
 coiled-coil region I
 hinge region
 coiled-coil region II
 Walker B ATP-binding motif; signature motif

Secondary and tertiary structure
SMC dimers form a V-shaped molecule with two long coiled-coil arms. To make such a unique structure, an SMC protomer is self-folded through anti-parallel coiled-coil interactions, forming a rod-shaped molecule. At one end of the molecule, the N-terminal and C-terminal domains form an ATP-binding domain. The other end is called a hinge domain. Two protomers then dimerize through their hinge domains and assemble a V-shaped dimer. The length of the coiled-coil arms is ~50 nm long. Such long "antiparallel" coiled coils are very rare and found only among SMC proteins (and their relatives such as Rad50). The ATP-binding domain of SMC proteins is structurally related to that of ABC transporters, a large family of transmembrane proteins that actively transport small molecules across cellular membranes. It is thought that the cycle of ATP binding and hydrolysis modulates the cycle of closing and opening of the V-shaped molecule. Still, the detailed mechanisms of action of SMC proteins remain to be determined.

Genes

The following human genes encode SMC proteins:
 SMC1A
 SMC1B
 SMC2
 SMC3
 SMC4
 SMC5
 SMC6

See also

 cohesin
 condensin
 Cornelia de Lange Syndrome

References 

EC 3.6.3
Cell biology
Mitosis
Cell cycle